Saint George is a 2016 Portuguese drama film directed by Marco Martins. It was selected as the Portuguese entry for the Best Foreign Language Film at the 90th Academy Awards, but it was not nominated.

Plot
Facing hard times, a former boxer must become a debt collector to provide for his family.

Cast
 Nuno Lopes as Jorge
 Mariana Nunes as Susana
 David Semedo as Nelson
 José Raposo as Vitinho
 Jean-Pierre Martins as Albano

See also
 List of submissions to the 90th Academy Awards for Best Foreign Language Film
 List of Portuguese submissions for the Academy Award for Best Foreign Language Film

References

External links
 

2016 films
2016 drama films
Portuguese drama films
2010s Portuguese-language films
Golden Globes (Portugal) winners
Sophia Award winners
Films directed by Marco Martins